Xialu may refer to:

Xialu District, in Huangshi, Hubei, China
Xialu Monastery, or Ṣalu Monastery, in Shigatse, Tibet